The dean of the United States Senate is an informal term for the senator with the longest continuous service, regardless of party affiliation. This is not an official position within the Senate, although customarily (since 1945) the longest-serving member of the majority party serves as president pro tempore.

The current dean is Republican Senator Chuck Grassley of Iowa. He has been in the Senate since 1981 and became dean in 2023 with the retirement of Patrick Leahy.

List of deans

Party deans

Democratic

Republican

Whig

National Republican

Democratic-Republican

Federalist

Pro-Administration

Anti-Administration

See also
 Baby of the United States Senate
 Oldest living United States president
 Dean of the United States House of Representatives
 List of members of the United States Congress by longevity of service

References 
Senators of the United States

Dean
Dean
Senior legislators
United States Senate
Lists related to the United States Senate